Émile Lambinet (1813, Versailles – 1877, Bougival) was a French painter of rural scenes. A student of Horace Vernet then Corot, he spent most of his life in Yvelines, at first in his birthplace of Versailles, then at Bougival from 1860.

Works at the musée Lambinet 
His cousin, Victor Lambinet, bequeathed the hotel Lambinet to the town of Versailles – it is now the musée Lambinet. Paintings there by Émile include :  
 Banks of the Seine near Bougival.
 Fishers beside a pond, 1860.
 The Château des Roches at Bièvres, 1874
 Île-de-France landscape with two foreground figures, 1872.
 Bouquet of flowers, 18(??).
 Landscape with boatmen, 1864.
 Banks of a river, summer.
 Road, 18(50).
 Bank of a river.
 View from the Pavillon du Butard near Versailles.

Bibliography 
  Peintures du musée Lambinet à Versailles, ed. Somogy et Musée Lambinet, 2005, s. l. (Italy), .

1813 births
1837 deaths
19th-century French painters
French male painters
19th-century French male artists